Joran Swart (born 6 April 1998) is a Dutch footballer who plays as a defender for Harkemase Boys.

Career
Born in Harderwijk, he joined the academy of SC Heerenveen in 2007 before switching to PEC Zwolle in 2016. In the summer of 2019, he joined Eerste Divisie club Go Ahead Eagles. He made his professional debut on 29 October 2019 in a 3–1 KNVB Cup win over fellow Eerste Divisie club Almere City. He made his league debut for the club on 20 December 2019 as a late substitute in a 3–0 win away at Jong FC Utrecht. He was released by Go Ahead Eagles at the end of the season.

On 13 August 2020, Swart signed for Harkemase Boys of the Derde Divisie.

Career statistics

References

External links
 
 

1998 births
Living people
People from Harderwijk
Footballers from Gelderland
Dutch footballers
Association football defenders
SC Heerenveen players
PEC Zwolle players
Go Ahead Eagles players
Harkemase Boys players
Eerste Divisie players